Ohio Premier Women's SC was an American women’s soccer team, founded in 2007. The team was a member of the Women's Premier Soccer League. The team played in the Mid Atlantic Conference.

The team played its home games at Dublin Scioto High School Stadium. The club's colors were white and black.

After the 2012 season, the Ohio Premier Women's SC dissolved, but Ohio Premier continues to run its youth soccer program.

Players

Current roster

Notable former players

Year-by-year

Honors

Competition history

Coaches
  Kevin Dougherty 2008–present
  Willie Gage 2008–present

Stadium

Average attendance

External links
 Official Site
 WPSL Ohio Premier Women's SC page

Women's Premier Soccer League teams
Women's soccer clubs in the United States
Soccer clubs in Ohio
2007 establishments in Ohio
Sports in Dublin, Ohio
Association football clubs established in 2007
2012 disestablishments in Ohio
Association football clubs disestablished in 2012
Women's sports in Ohio